Vishram Ghat is a ghat, a bath and worship place, on the banks of river Yamuna in Mathura, India. The traditional parikrama starts and ends at Vishram Ghat. Krishna is said to have rested at this place after killing Kamsa.

References 

Tourist attractions in Mathura
Ghats of India